Bayazeh Castle is a historical castle located in Khur and Biabanak County in Isfahan Province, The longevity of this fortress dates back to the Sasanian Empire.

References 

Castles in Iran
Sasanian castles